The  was a Japanese political party that existed briefly from 1992 to 1994.

The party, considered liberal, was founded by Morihiro Hosokawa, a former Diet member and Kumamoto Prefecture governor, who left the Liberal Democratic Party to protest corruption scandals. In 1992, the party elected four members to the House of Councillors, including Hosokawa. Although this was a disappointing result for them, in 1993 they were able to capitalize on voter dissatisfaction with the LDP, electing a total of 35 members (including 3 who joined after the election). Hosokawa became Prime Minister leading a broad coalition, but was soon forced to resign.

The party defended the political reformism, rights of consumers and supported decentralization.

By 1994, the Japan New Party dissolved, its members flowing into the New Frontier Party (新進党).

List of leaders of JNP

Election results

House of Representatives

House of Councillors

See also
Liberalism in Japan
Conservative mainstream (in Japanese)
Yukio Edano, is a Japanese left-liberal politician who claims to be a "Conservative mainstream" because his early political career was in the centre-right liberal Japan New Party.

References

Political parties established in 1992
Political parties disestablished in 1994
1992 establishments in Japan
1994 disestablishments in Japan
Centre-right parties in Asia
Centrist parties in Japan
Conservative parties in Japan
Defunct liberal political parties
Defunct political parties in Japan
Liberal conservative parties
Liberal parties in Japan